Die Funktion des Orgasmus ("The Function of the Orgasm") is a monograph about the ability to achieve orgasm published in 1927 by Sigmund Freud's follower Wilhelm Reich, later published in English as Genitality in the Theory and Therapy of Neurosis. In it, Reich proposed, based on his therapeutic experience and empirical studies, that orgastic potency should be used as a decisive criterion for mental health.

Neurotic disorder, according to Reich, was always based on a more or less pronounced "orgastic impotence". According to Reich, if a man were permanently unable to experience a "complete orgasm", it would cause a blockage of the libido, which would produce a variety of disorders. Reich saw  the treatment goal of psychoanalytic treatment as the restoration of "orgastic potency". To achieve this objective, Reich further developed the psychoanalytic technique: first analysis of resistance, then Character Analysis, finally, to Vegetotherapy.

Editions

After being published in 1927 by the International Psychoanalytic Press, Die Funktion des Orgasmus was never republished or translated until a revised, second edition was published in English in 1980 by Farrar Straus and Giroux. The editors of the second edition changed the title to Genitality in the Theory and Therapy of Neurosis, to avoid confusion with Reich's 1942 The Function of the Orgasm. The latter was a scientific autobiography which included only the detailed description of the orgasm process from the 1927 Die Funktion des Orgasmus.

All other changes to the second edition were made by Reich himself between 1937 and 1945. These changes usually reflected his separation from Sigmund Freud and psychoanalysis. Moreover, the changes indicate that Reich saw his search for understanding genitality as his own commitment to finding the energy source of neurosis, rather than it reflecting Freudian theory or practice. One such change includes reversing the order of the first two chapter, now beginning with presenting orgastic potency instead of the Freudian understanding of the neurotic conflict.

Work
Reich, Wilhelm (1927) Die Funktion Des Orgasmus: Zur Psychopathologie und zur Soziologie des Geschlechtslebens, Vienna: Internationale Psychoanalytische Verlag. Second, revised edition published in English in 1980 as Genitality in the Theory and Therapy of Neurosis, New York: Farrar, Straus and Giroux, .

References

See also 
 Character Analysis

1927 non-fiction books
Books about orgasm
Works by Wilhelm Reich